2014 Isle of Man Festival of Motorcycling including the Manx Grand Prix and the Classic TT Races were held between Saturday 16 August and Friday 29 August 2014 on the 37.73-mile Mountain Course.

Sources

Manx Grand Prix
Manx
Manx Grand Prix
Manx